The historic parish of Bircle, near Bury, England, was created on 1 July 1846, although the village of Bircle (nowadays known as Birtle) pre-dates this by many centuries. It is believed that 'Bircle' is a shortening of the phrase 'Birch Hill', as it was suggested that there were birch trees in the parish. Names such as "Cleggs Wood", "Simpson Clough" and "Dobb Wood" appear on early Ordnance Survey maps. "Hill' did appear in the fourteenth century in the name of 'Birkhill' but it never found a permanent place. Over a period of time its name has also appeared as Brithull, 1243; Birlcil, 1246; Birkhill, 1334, 1573; but Bircle appears in the Diocese of Manchester directory in England.

Bircle Church is on Castle Hill Road.

Parish

Vicars of the parish
Thomas Wilson 1846–1891
Charles Renshaw 1891–1920
R P Trend-Smith 1920–1935
J W Maddison 1936–1957
R H Pickering 1958–1962
Arthur J Dobb 1962–1972
David Harrison 1972–1983
Marcus Maxwell 1984–1993
Arthur Ross Brockbank 1993–2012
Gordon Joyce 2012–2019
Harvie Nicol 2019-

The church

 
The church of St John the Baptist, also known as Bircle Church, is a listed building for its special architectural or historic interest.
The church was designed by architect George Shaw and was first dedicated in 1846. It is a small church and is a relatively early example of ecclesiologically correct Gothic rock-faced ashlar with ashlar dressings and slate roofs with stone-coped gables. The nave and chancel both have hammer beam roofs rising from stone corbels. Carved angels holding shields are on the ends of the hammer beams.
There are four stained glass windows in the nave. These were given in memory of loved ones. They depict Ruth, St Peter, St Paul and Mary, the mother of Jesus. On the wooded ceiling are carved angel figures.
Long:-2.260 Lat:53.607

The Workhouse

In 1852, plans were made for a workhouse to accommodate 400 inmates, with a separate 60-bed hospital in Jericho. Jericho Workhouse, also known as the Bury Union Workhouse, was opened on 21 January 1857, and a year later the total expenditure for the scheme had swollen to £20,481. Inmates came from as far away as Spain. In the 1881 census a 64-year-old named Susannah Allport, a Bonnet Maker (Milliner) from	Salamanca was in residence.

Today it is the site of Fairfield General Hospital.

Historical timeline of Bury Workhouse
The Road to Jericho

1775- A workhouse was built on Manchester Road, Redvales, Bury.

1825 - Bury Select Vestry recommended that the town needed to build a new workhouse or improve the existing one.

1827 - The Vestry decided to extend the existing Bury workhouse.

1837 - The Poor Law Union was formally declared on 8 February

1850 - The Bury Board of Guardians were refused an extension on the lease of land for the workhouses

1852 - The Bury Board of Guardians gave notice that they were prepared to receive plans and specifications for a new Union workhouse capable of support 400 inmates with suitable outbuildings, yards and conveniences.

1853 - The Vaccination Act introduced compulsory vaccination against smallpox. It required that every child, health permitting should be vaccinated within 3 months, or in the case of orphans, 4 months of birth.

1855 - Work began on the new Bury Union workhouse at Jericho, almost two miles east of Bury on Rochdale Old Road.

1857 - The Bury Union workhouse opened on 21 January. The total cost of building and land was £21,418.

1858 - The Bury Union workhouse was consecrated by the Bishop of Manchester on 26 July

1862 - Additions were made to the Bury Union workhouse providing separate infant accommodation.

1867 - The poor law guardians were to control vaccination districts and pay vaccinator from 1 - 3 shillings per child vaccinated in the district.

1868 - Additions were made to the Bury Union Workhouse to provide separate accommodation for the 'insane'.

1877 - On 9 June the foundation stone for a new 32 bed infectious diseases hospital at Jericho site was made by Alderman John Duckworth, chairman of the Bury Board of Guardians. There was also to be a nurses' home and mortuary.

1878 - The infectious diseases unit was opened on 24 August

1903-1905 - A new 126 bed infirmary with a maternity ward and staff accommodation was erected on the Jericho site. The site was officially opened on 20 September 1905.

1904 - The Registrar General requested that the workhouse births were to be disguised by the use of postal addresses. Birth certificates for those born in the Bury Union workhouse gave the address 380 Rochdale Old Road, Bury and did not name the workhouse.

1911 - Bury Union workhouse added an annexe to house male inmates.

1929 - Bury Union workhouse was renamed Jericho Institution.

1946 - The last burial took place at the Jericho Institution cemetery.

1948 - The Jericho Institution became part of the NHS and was renamed Fairfield General Hospital.

Cheesden Valley

The Cheesden Valley runs on a north-south alignment between Bury and Rochdale. Cheesden Brook runs through the valley, joining with Naden Brook to eventually run into the River Roch near Heywood. During the industrial age, the valley became a centre of cotton production, dependent on running water. The valley is now slowly but surely reclaiming the once busy mills and returning them to nature. The Lost Mills can be seen from the air as they slowly and inexorably decay. It encompasses Deeply Vale, Bircle Dene and Ashworth Valley.

Mining

As early as 1580, Queen Elizabeth I granted John Blackwall the right to mine coal in the Cheesden Valley. In addition, it is believed that during the 17th century, small communities – "folds" – could have had their own mines.

Pre-Industrial History
There are signs of human activity dating from about 8000 BC. Flints from the Mesolithic period have been found in the Cheesden Valley and Knowl Moor areas. All were discovered on high ground close to a water source, and all are quite small and suitable for use as arrowheads and similar objects.

References

 
 
 
 
 
 
 
 
 BBC Domesday Reloaded

Archives Plus

Archives+ has created an archive centre of excellence in the heart of Manchester.  The project brings together statutory, university and voluntary organisations to provide a holistic range of archive and heritage services from one location.  Archives+ raises awareness of and provides easy access to our histories for the broadest possible audiences.

Bury, Greater Manchester